Sor Rotana (born 9 October 2002), is a Cambodian footballer currently playing as a defender for Visakha in the Cambodian Premier League and the Cambodia national team

Career statistics

International

References

External links
 

2002 births
Living people
Sportspeople from Phnom Penh
Cambodian footballers
Cambodia international footballers
Association football defenders
Prey Veng FC players